The Vatin culture ( or ) is a name of an prehistoric Bronze Age culture, which was named after Vatin, a village in Serbia. The culture had Indo-European roots and was culturally connected with Mycenaean Greece. The Vatin culture is dated to the middle Bronze Age and is generally divided into three phases: Pančevo-Omoljica, Vatin-Vršac, and Belegiš-Ilandža. It flourished from the 16th to the 13th century BC.

The people of the Vatin culture inhabited the entire territory of Vojvodina (Banat, Bačka, Syrmia) and many surrounding areas (including Slavonia, Oltenia, Bosnia and Central Serbia). Its core area was in Serbian-Vojvodinian Podunavlje. The remains of this culture were discovered at the beginning of the 20th century near the village of Vatin (Banat region, Vojvodina province, Serbia). However the real importance of this culture was only realised at the end of the 20th century, when the locality of Feudvar near the village of Mošorin was investigated.

Characteristics

The Vatin culture was highly influenced by Mycenaean Greece and had already developed social differentiation within its population. The culture also developed large central settlements, which were surrounded by smaller settlements and farms. Large settlements were economical and social centers, as well as the seats of tribal leaders. These fortified centers had a defensive character and a large number of them existed in the wider area. The thick network of large fortified settlements represents an example of the collective defense of a wide space.

The main occupations of inhabitants of the Vatin culture was agriculture and animal husbandry and it is assumed that they also produced beer. In many of the settlements, remains of children's toys were discovered. Tools, weapons and jewelry were mainly purchased by trade, but some larger settlements also had their own workshops that produced bronze objects. One foundry of bronze objects was discovered in Feudvar, and according to the researchers, it was probably used for several hundreds of years. There are indications that people of the Vatin culture also had basic mathematical knowledge.

According to Anthony (2007), chariotry spread westwards to the Vatin culture from the Multi-cordoned ware culture.

Gallery

Localities

Localities of the Vatin culture are:
Vatin
Pančevo
Omoljica
Popov Salaš
Belegiš
Vinča
Vinkovci
Sotin
Sarvaš
Lovas
Vukovar
Feudvar near Mošorin
Novigrad na Savi
Ludoš
Gomolava
Ljuljaci
Dobrača
Židovar

References

Further reading
Dr Predrag Medović, Praistorija na tlu Vojvodine, Novi Sad, 2001.
Dr M. Grbić, Preistorisko doba Vojvodine, Zbornik "Vojvodina", knjiga I, PROMETEJ, Novi Sad, 2008.

External links
Vatin čeka arheologe - Vatin waits for archaeologists (in Serbian)
Bronzano doba - Bronze Age (in Croatian)
Dragoslav Srejović, Kad smo bili kulturno središte sveta, Beograd, 2001. - When we were cultural center of the World (in Serbian)
Praistorija na tlu Srbije - Prehistory on Serbian soil (in Serbian)
Praistorija na tlu Srbije - Prehistory on Serbian soil (in Serbian)
Kulture bronzanog doba u Vojvodini - Bronze Age cultures in Vojvodina (In Serbian)

Archaeological cultures of Southeastern Europe
Archaeological cultures in Serbia
Archaeological cultures in Romania
Archaeological cultures in Croatia
Archaeological cultures in Bosnia and Herzegovina
Bronze Age cultures of Europe
Bronze Age Serbia
Prehistory of Romania
Prehistoric Bosnia and Herzegovina
Prehistoric Bulgaria
History of Banat
Prehistory of Vojvodina
Indo-European archaeological cultures